Luca Villa (born 14 November 1999) is an Italian professional footballer who plays as a left back for  club U.S. Pergolettese 1932.

Club career
Born in Segrate, Villa started his career in Monza and Renate youth system. He was promoted to Renate first team for the 2016–17 season.

He joined Serie D club Pergolettese in 2017, and won the promotion in 2018–19 Serie D season. Villa was named the captain team in 2020, and played his 100 match for Pergolettese on 25 November 2020 against Pro Vercelli.

Honours
Pergolettese
 Serie D (Group D): 2018–19

References

External links
 
 

1999 births
Living people
People from Segrate
Footballers from Lombardy
Italian footballers
Association football defenders
Serie C players
Serie D players
A.C. Renate players
U.S. Pergolettese 1932 players
Sportspeople from the Metropolitan City of Milan